Lunomyia is a genus of rat-tail maggot flies in the family Syrphidae. This genus has a single species, Lunomyia cooleyi. It was formerly a member of the genus Lejops.

References

Eristalinae